Macey Stewart (born 16 January 1996) is an Australian professional racing cyclist. She joined the Orica–AIS team in 2015. Stewart took two gold medals at the 2014 UCI Juniors Track World Championships, in the omnium and as part of the successful Australian team pursuit squad, and went on to win the junior time trial at the 2014 UCI Road World Championships in Ponferrada.

Major results
2015
Oceania Track Championships
1st  Points Race
2nd Individual Pursuit
2nd Team Pursuit (with Georgia Baker, Lauren Perry and Elissa Wundersitz)
2017
3rd Omnium, ITS Melbourne – Hisense Grand Prix

See also
 List of 2015 UCI Women's Teams and riders

References

External links

1996 births
Living people
Australian female cyclists
Place of birth missing (living people)